Mesotrophe is a genus of moths in the family Geometridae erected by George Hampson in 1893. Lepidoptera and Some Other Life Forms regards it as a synonym of Anisodes.

Species
 Mesotrophe alienaria (Walker, 1863)
 Mesotrophe curtisi Prout 1920
 Mesotrophe harrietae Robinson 1975
 Mesotrophe impavida Prout 1938
 Mesotrophe intortaria Guenée [1858]
 Mesotrophe maximaria Guenée [1858]
 Mesotrophe nephelospila Meyrick 1889
 Mesotrophe rudis Prout 1920

References

Sterrhinae